Alice Ivers Duffield Tubbs Huckert (February 17, 1851 – February 27, 1930), better known as Poker Alice, Poker Alice Ivers or Poker Alice Tubbs, was an English poker and faro player in the American West.

Her family moved from Devon, England, where she was born, to Virginia, United States, where she was reared and educated. As an adult, Ivers moved to Leadville, Colorado, where she met her first husband, Frank Duffield. He got Ivers interested in poker, but he was killed a few years after they married. Ivers made a name for herself by winning money from poker games in places like Silver City, New Mexico, and even working at a saloon in Creede, Colorado, that was owned by Bob Ford, the man who killed Jesse James.

Early life
"Poker" Alice Ivers was born in England, to Irish immigrants. Her family moved to Virginia when Alice was twelve. As a young woman, she went to boarding school in Virginia to become a refined lady. While in her late teens, her family moved to Leadville, a city in the then Colorado Territory.

Personal life

It was in Leadville that Alice met Frank Duffield, whom she married at a young age. Frank Duffield was a mining engineer who played poker in his spare time. After just a few years of marriage, Duffield was killed in an accident while resetting a dynamite charge in a Leadville mine.

Ivers was known for splurging her winnings, as when she won a lot of money in Silver City and spent it all in New York. After all of her big wins, she would travel to New York and spend her money on clothes. She was very keen on keeping up with the latest fashions and would buy dresses to wear to play poker, partly as a business investment to distract her opponents.

Alice met her next husband around 1890 when she was a dealer in Bedrock Tom's saloon in Deadwood, South Dakota. When a drunken miner tried to attack her fellow dealer Warren G. Tubbs with a knife, Alice threatened him with her .38. After this incident, Tubbs and Ivers started a romance and were married soon after.

Some sources report Alice and Warren had seven children together, other sources report they did not have any children together, but Alice brought two children into the marriage, a daughter and a son, giving Warren two stepchildren. Her son, George, who would take on the Tubbs name. In 1934, George would be saved from a train, after he was found lying on the tracks. Two women were able to pull him to safety just in time to save his life. At the time of the incident, he was 65 years old, putting his birth around 1868. 

Warren was a painter by trade, and it was speculated that through his work, he contracted tuberculosis. For the last years of Warren's life, Alice tried to help him regain his health. A few months before Warren died, Alice moved him to a ranch on the Moreau River, 100 miles from Sturgis. It was there that Warren died on December 31, 1909. 

To secure a proper burial and funeral, Alice wrapped Warren's body in blankets, placed him in their lumber wagon, and with her team of horses, traveled to Sturgis. It would take Alice four days to travel along the snow covered trails to the city of Sturgis, where she was able to arrange for a funeral for Warren. In order to pay off the funeral costs, Alice would travel to Rapid City, where she worked as a bartender for Black Nell in Nell's resort.

Alice's third husband was George Huckert, who worked on her homestead taking care of the sheep. Huckert was constantly proposing to Ivers. Eventually, Ivers owed Huckert $1,008, so she married him, figuring that it would be cheaper than paying his back wages. Huckert died on October 12, 1924.

Poker career
After the death of her first husband, Alice started to play poker seriously. Alice was in a tough financial position. After failing in a few different jobs including teaching, she turned to poker to support herself financially. Alice would make money by gambling and working as a dealer. Ivers made a name for herself by winning money from poker games. By the time Ivers was given the name "Poker Alice," she was drawing in large crowds to watch her play and men were constantly challenging her to play. Saloon owners liked that Ivers was a respectable woman who kept to her values. These values included her refusal to play poker on Sundays.

As her reputation grew, so did the amount of money she was making. Some nights she would even make $6,000, an incredibly large sum of money at the time. Alice claimed that she won $250,000, which would now be worth more than three million dollars.

Ivers used her good looks to distract men at the poker table. She always had the newest dresses, and even in her 50s was considered a very attractive woman. She was also very good at counting cards and figuring odds, which helped her at the table.

Alice was known always to have carried a gun with her, preferably her .38, and frequently smoked cigars.

Poker's Palace and jail time
After Warren Tubbs death, Alice eventually purchased a building which sat on the south side of Bear Butte Creek, between the city of Sturgis and Fort Meade, South Dakota, where the current Sturgis City Park now stands. "Poker Alice's" resort, as it was commonly known, gained notoriety in 1913 due a confrontation between soldiers of Troop K, stationed at Fort Meade, and Alice herself. 

Trouble had initially developed between the soldiers and Alice in the early part of July, 1913, a little over a week before the shooting. Later that week, the trouble was rekindled, and finally once again on Monday, July 14. Around 10:30pm, five soldiers of Troop K, accompanied by a number of members of the South Dakota guard, which had recently been stationed at Fort Meade, went to Alice's resort for the intention of starting a "rough house." After the soldiers were refused admittance, they began throwing stones through the windows of Alice's resort and cutting telephone and electric wires. In response, Alice opened fired, landing five shots. One struck a Private Fred Koestle of Troop K in the head, and around midnight, he died from the wound. Another soldier, 22-year-old Joseph C. Miner was also shot, with the bullet passing three inches above his heart. While he was initially expected to also die from his wounds, he would later recover. Three other individuals were also struck, including a civilian.

Immediately following the shooting, police, the sheriff and his deputies arrived at the scene. Alice, along with six of her girls would be placed under arrest, and sent to the county jail. No charges would be filed by State's Attorney Gray of Meade county against Alice, for the shooting and subsequent death of Private Koestle. After investigating the facts of that night, it was determined that Alice was justified in the shooting as she was defending, or attempting to defend, her personal property. However, she was charged with keeping a house of "illfame," and her six girls, Jennie Palmer, Bessie Brundidge, Ann Carr, Birdie Harris, Mabel Smith, and Edith Brown, were convicted of frequenting a house of "illfame."

Two years later, another confrontation at Poker Alice's resort led to the shooting of several soldiers, and one civilian. Private Cadwell was shot in the abdominal region, Private Wood in the neck, and an unnamed civilian in the arm. The incident was written off simply as a "booze" fight.

Alice continued to have run-ins with the law, culminating in the 1920s. In 1924, her resort was raided for bootlegging. The following year, her resort was raided, possibly for the last time, and Alice was charged and convicted of operating a house of prostitution. 

In 1928, facing time in the state penitentiary for her convictions of bootlegging and running a house of prostitution, Alice's community came together to petition the governor to grant her a pardon. The claim made was that Alice was in poor health, and confinement to prison could be fatal for her. Hundreds signed the petition. On December 20, 1928, the pardon was granted by then Governor William J. Bulow.

Death
After being pardoned by then Governor William J. Bulow, Poker Alice appears to have retired. No future run-ins with the law would be reported. 

On Thursday, February 6, 1930, Alice underwent a gallbladder operation in Rapid City. There was a general fear that recovery would be difficult due to her advanced age; however, just two days later, it appeared that Alice was recovering speedily and it appeared as if she would be able to return home before long. Her recovery continued to appear to be progressing, but her doctors did warn that there was no surety she was out of danger. On February 27, 1930, Alice died.

Funeral services would be held for Alice on March 1, 1930, at the St. Aloysius Cemetery in Sturgis, South Dakota. Father Columban, of the Catholic Church, gave a sermon at her grave.

Alice left one final surprise, as when her will was read, it was revealed that Alice had disinherited her relatives for not paying attention to her in her declining years, and instead, divided her estate among her friends.

Legacy

In 1960, Barbara Stuart played Poker Alice in a three-part episode of The Texan.WT
Ivers has been fictionalized in several films, including the 1978 TV movie The New Maverick with James Garner as Bret Maverick and Susan Sullivan as Poker Alice Ivers. In another television film, Poker Alice, Elizabeth Taylor plays the cigar-smoking and bordello-owning poker player. The film is so fictionalized that the character is given another surname.
Ivers is also mentioned as one of the legends of the Wild West in the Lucky Luke album Calamity Jane.

References

External links

 A story of Poker Alice in comic format, by Jack Tzekov, 2014
 The Ballad of Poker Alice Ivers by Larry Kenneth Potts, 2014

1851 births
1930 deaths
People of the American Old West
Ranchers from South Dakota
American poker players
Saloonkeepers
American brothel owners and madams
English emigrants to the United States
People from Virginia
People from Leadville, Colorado
People from Sturgis, South Dakota